The Governor of Volgograd Oblast is the head of government of Volgograd Oblast, a federal subject of Russia.

The position was introduced in 1991 as Head of Administration of Volgograd Oblast. The Governor is elected by direct popular vote for a term of five years.

List of officeholders

References 

Politics of Volgograd Oblast
 
Volgograd